Baumert is a surname. Notable people with the surname include:

 Andrea Baumert (born 1967), German high jumper
 Jean Baumert (1902–1968), French sport wrestler

See also
 Baumer